The 1962 Basque Pelota World Championships were the 4th edition of the Basque Pelota World Championships organized by  the FIPV.

Participating nations

Events
A total of 12 events were disputed, in 4 playing areas.

Trinquete, 5 events disputed

Fronton (30 m), 1 event disputed

Fronton (36 m), 5 events disputed

Fronton (54 m), 1 event disputed

Medal table

References

World Championships,1962
World Championships
1962 in European sport
Sport in Pamplona
International sports competitions hosted by Spain
1962 in Spanish sport
September 1962 sports events in Europe
World Championships,1962